is a district located in Miyagi Prefecture, Japan.

As of 2003, the district has an estimated population of 15,266 and a population density of 36.71 persons per km2. The total area is 415.85 km2.

Towns and villages
Shichikashuku
Zaō

Districts in Miyagi Prefecture